The following is a list of episodes for the British BBC television drama, The Cut. The third series finished airing in December 2010 bringing the total number of episodes to 40 as 25-minute episodes and 200 as 5-minute episodes. The BBC have since confirmed that The Cut has not been recommissioned for a fourth series.

Summary

Episodes
The following is a list of episodes for the British BBC television drama, The Cut.

Series 1 (Sept – Dec 2009)

The 15-part first series was commissioned by the BBC in 2009 and began airing on 19 September 2009 and concluded on 19 December 2009 with the last two episodes shown together as a double bill. Each episode is 25 minutes long but is split up into daily five 5-minute daily chunks online throughout the week before the official broadcast. The series was repeated almost immediately after it had ended.

The series started by introducing six main characters – Jay, Marla, Olive, Stephen, Mack and Toni. Fin and Rosa also appeared in the first episode, but initially played a recurring role and did not become regular characters until later in the series. Another character, Tommy, is introduced in Episode 9. Marla's mother Amy makes a guest appearance in Episode 11, before joining the cast as a regular in Episode 14. At the end of the series, Jay and Fin are written out.

Series 2 (Apr – Aug 2010)

In February 2010 it was announced that the BBC has commissioned a second series of The Cut with a 13-part series which again each episode would be split up throughout each week in daily five-minute chunks. Open auditions for a new male (Alex) and a new female role (Catherine) were held shortly before the second series began filming, although many young hopefuls impressed the producers, but were not suited to those characters and had characters written for them instead, resulting in a lot more characters being introduced in the second series. The second series began airing on 24 April 2010 and concluded on 14 August 2010. A four-week break was taken after the first 8 episodes due to Wimbledon and the World Cup taking place. No repeats as yet have been shown of the second series, probably because the third series started less than two months later.

In the first episode, Frankie, Cameron, Alex and Rory are introduced. Episode 4 introduces Catherine and Episode 5 introduces Elliott. In the first few episodes, Rosa plays an extremely important role before disappearing from the series without explanation. Tommy is written out of the series at the end of Episode 6, but later returns at the end of Episode 12, just before the finale. Jay returns at the end of Episode 10, and stays for the rest of the series before being written out again, this time for good. Amy is also written out at the end of the series and Olive is killed off.

Series 3 (Sept – Dec 2010)

In July 2010 it was announced that the BBC had commissioned a third series of The Cut. Series 3 began on 2 October 2010 and concluded on 18 December 2010. The third series is 12 episodes long with each episode being split up in daily five minute segments like the previous two series. While this series was airing, it was the consensus of many fans that with the closure of BBC Switch, Series 3 might be the final series, but this had not been confirmed by the BBC at that point, although it now has been. After the first episode, a one-week break was taken due to The Commonwealth Games airing on the BBC, but an interactive episode launched on the Facebook page during the week, depicting Catherine's first day at Radio 1. The second and third episodes were shown together as a double bill.

As with the previous two series, Series 3 introduces several new characters. Episode 1 introduces Jack, Ryan, Ruby and Taylor. Luke is introduced in Episode 2 and Noah in Episode 4. Toni and Tommy are both written out at the start of the first episode – they appear at Olive's funeral and then both announce that they're leaving. Stephen plays a much less important role in this series – he leaves to go to Oxford at the end of Episode 3, although he appears briefly when Alex phones him in Episode 11, and he also appears in Episode 12 (the finale.) Rosa also returns in Series 3, in a recurring role similar to the role she played in Series 1. In Episode 2, it is announced that Rory has left, having not appeared since the end of Series 2. Amy also reappears unexpectedly in the final two episodes, and Olive appears as a ghostly apparition in the final scene.

Cut